Pizzarias Pizza Chips were a line of snack chips made by the Keebler Company and were developed by Adam Burck, Keebler's New Product Development Manager at the time.

History
Pizzarias were made in a novel process from fresh pizza dough and were available in three flavors: Cheese Pizza, Pizza Supreme, and Zesty Pepperoni. Launched in 1991, Pizzarias were reported to be the most successful snack food launch in Keebler's history, earning wholesale revenue of $75 million in their first year. Due to the success of the Pizzarias launch, Keebler was named "New Product Marketer of the Year" in 1992 by the American Marketing Association. Pizzarias also earned a Gold Edison award from the AMA for marketing excellence.

Pizzarias was supported by an extensive marketing campaign, including a series of three television commercials introducing the first teenage Keebler Elves, with slang catch-phrases such as "Radical grub!" and the tagline: "Tastes like real pizza, only louder."

Although the brand was ultimately discontinued after the sale and breakup of Keebler in the late 1990s, Pizzarias developed a cult following. At least two Pizzarias fan groups on Facebook, such as "Bring back Pizzaria Chips made by Keebler" and "Bring Keebler Pizzaria's Back"  are lobbying Utz Quality Foods, the current owner of the trademark, to relaunch the brand; as of October, 2021, the groups had over 7,000 Followers.

Pizzarias in Popular Culture
Pizzarias were mentioned in the Netflix original series, Everything Sucks! and "rank high on the list of snack foods that still haunt ’90s kids as adults."

In 2017 The Daily Meal included Pizzarias in its list of the most popular snack foods in the last ten decades.

References

External links 
 Pizzarias TV ad 1: Keebler "New!" Pizzarias "Radical" TV Ad - 1989/1990
 Pizzarias TV ad 2: Keebler Pizzarias
 Pizzarias TV ad 3: Totally Radical Keebler Pizzarias Pizza Chips Commercial, 1991

American snack foods
Products introduced in 1991
Products and services discontinued in 2000